Hollywood Husbands is a 1986 novel by the British author Jackie Collins. It was her 11th novel, and the second in her "Hollywood" series, after her 1983 hit Hollywood Wives.

Hollywood Husbands is an unrelated sequel to Hollywood Wives and features a new cast of characters. Although it continues the theme of power and celebrity in Hollywood, the novel also contains a mystery plot about a young girl from a small American town, who was sexually abused and later left for dead. Years later, the Hollywood husbands may be the ones to feel the heat of her burning revenge.

Collins went on to pen several more "Hollywood" titled books, including Hollywood Kids (1994), Hollywood Wives: The New Generation (2001), and Hollywood Divorces (2003). Although these further novels tend to be separate works rather than direct sequels, characters from the original Hollywood Wives have made brief appearances in the other novels.

Main characters

 Jack Python is the hottest Hollywood Husband of all. He rules nighttime T.V. and his controversial talk show burns up ratings, while the women he encounters melt. With one expensive divorce behind him, and involved in a highly erotic affair with Oscar-winning actress Clarissa Browning, Jack Python has power, charisma, success, and money. But sometimes everything is not enough.
 Howard Soloman, head of Orpheus Studios is the man, the Hollywood King. Anything Howard wants, he gets. Including the women. The sweet smell of power and Howard's street-smart style reels them in. Working for billionaire studio owner Zachary Klinger, a man with a whim of iron, Howard has problems enough. And if Howard cannot deliver daytime soap megastar Silver Anderson at Klinger's command, he may lose his footing at the top of the heap. Though in Hollywood it is said that when you fall, you fall up—from the top Howard has nowhere to go but down.
 Mannon Cable is a superstar. With great looks and a body to match, he is full of self-deprecating charm. Married briefly to gorgeous Whitney Valentine, who left him to become a television superstar; he was hit by the divorce where it really hurts—his giant ego.
 Jade Johnson - a top New York model.
 Silver Anderson - a successful prime time television soap opera star.
 Wesley Money - Wesley or Wes is the young, handsome husband of Silver Anderson. He is a street smart ex bar attender who loves Silver and takes care of all her needs. 
 Whitney Valentine - Mannon's ex-wife and a beautiful but talentless actress and pop star.
 Clarissa Browning - a "serious", award-winning Hollywood actress who is also a psychotic serial killer.

References 

Novels by Jackie Collins
Novels about actors
1986 British novels
Hollywood novels
Simon & Schuster books